A constitutional court is a high court that deals primarily with constitutional law. Its main authority is to rule on whether laws that are challenged are in fact unconstitutional, i.e. whether they conflict with constitutionally established rules, rights, and freedoms, among other things.

In 1919 the First Austrian Republic established the first dedicated constitutional court, the Constitutional Court of Austria, which however existed in name only until 10 October 1920, when the country's new constitution came into effect, upon which the court gained the power to review the laws of Austria's federal states. The 1920 Constitution of Czechoslovakia, which came into effect on 2 February 1920, was the first to provide for a dedicated court for judicial review of parliamentary laws, but the court did not convene until November 1921. The organization and competences of both courts were influenced by constitutional theories of Hans Kelsen. Subsequently, this idea of having a separate special constitutional court that only heard cases concerning the constitutionality of the national legislature's acts became known as the Austrian System, and it was subsequently adopted by many other countries e.g. Liechtenstein (1925), Greece (1927), Spain (1931), Germany (1949) etc.

The list in this article is of 63 countries that have a separate constitutional court. Many countries do not have separate constitutional courts, but instead delegate constitutional judicial authority to their ordinary court system, with the final decision-making power resting in the supreme ordinary court. Nonetheless, such courts are sometimes also called "constitutional courts".  For example, the Supreme Court of the United States has been called the world's oldest constitutional court because it was one of the earliest courts in the world to invalidate a law as unconstitutional (Marbury v. Madison), even though it is not a separate constitutional court, hearing as it does cases not touching on the Constitution.

Prior to 1919, the United States, Canada and Australia had adopted the concept of judicial review by their courts, following shared principles of their similar common law legal systems, which they, in turn, had inherited from British legal practice (the United Kingdom does not have a codified constitution and judicial review of primary legislation is prohibited). The Parthenopean Republic's constitution of 1799, written by Mario Pagano, envisaged an organ of magistrates reviewing constitutional law, the eforato, but lasted only 6 months.

List 

Countries with separate constitutional courts include:

 Albania
 Angola
 Armenia
 Austria
 Azerbaijan
 Belarus
 Belgium
 Benin
 Bosnia and Herzegovina
 Bulgaria
 Myanmar
 Chad
 Chile
 Colombia
 Democratic Republic of the Congo
 Croatia
 Czech Republic
 Dominican Republic
 Ecuador
 Egypt
 Gabon
 Georgia
 Germany
 Guatemala
 Hungary
 Indonesia
 Iran
 Italy
 Jordan
 Kazakhstan
 Republic of Korea (South Korea)
 Kosovo
 Kuwait
 Kyrgyzstan
 Latvia
 Lebanon
 Lithuania
 Luxembourg
 Republic of North Macedonia
 Malta
 Moldova
 Mongolia
 Niger
 Peru
 Poland
 Portugal
 Romania
 Russia
 Serbia
 Singapore
 Slovakia
 Slovenia
 South Africa
 Spain
 Suriname
 Syria
 Republic of China (Taiwan)
 Thailand
 Turkey
 Uganda
 Ukraine
 Uzbekistan
 Zambia
 Zimbabwe

See also 

 Constitution
 Constitutional Council (disambiguation)
 Constitutional institution
 Constitutionalism
 Constitutional economics
 Judiciary
 Jurisprudence
 Parliamentary sovereignty
 Rule of law
 Rule According to Higher Law

Footnotes 

 
Courts by type